Paul Bernon is an American businessman and film producer. His film Best Kept Secret was awarded a Peabody Award in 2014.

Education and real estate career 
Bernon studied film at Boston University, and received a graduate degree in real estate from New York University. Bernon is now Managing Partner at PMB Ventures,  a private holding company focusing on investments in real estate, entertainment, and venture capital. Representative investments include Rubicon Real Estate, Burn Later Productions, and startups that include Cameo, Reggora, Fisker, WiTricity, Religion of Sports, Elite HRV, PickUp, and MuddHouse Media.

Film production 
In 2012 Bernon produced a short film entitled Teacher of the Year that was screened at the Tribeca Film Festival, and now lives on Funny or Die. That year he also co-founded the independent film production company Burn Later Productions, and produced and funded the completion of the documentary Best Kept Secret on the subject of Autism. Following the film, Bernon was named a "visionary leader" for his work advocating for those with disabilities, and awarded a Peabody Award for the work in 2014 as one of the film's executive producers.

One of the first films he financed and executive produced was An Oversimplification of Her Beauty. He then produced the film Drinking Buddies, which was financed with connections he made through his screenings of Teacher of the Year. He also produced the film Adult Beginners in 2015. That year Bernon was also a producer of the film Results, a feature-length romantic comedy that initially screened  at Sundance Film Festival. In 2016 he produced the relationship comedy The Intervention. In 2017 he produced the films Small Crimes   and Lemon.

His latest films, A Kid Like Jake, starring Claire Danes, Jim Parsons, Octavia Spencer and Priyanka Chopra, and Hearts Beat Loud, starring Nick Offerman, Kiersey Clemons, Ted Danson, and Toni Collette, had their world premieres at the 2018 Sundance Film Festival, and were released theatrically in June 2018.

Politics
Bernon is an active volunteer in Democratic politics. He is Vice Chair of the board at EMILY's List, and a member of the National Finance Committee at the Democratic National Committee. Paul was formerly finance chair for the campaigns of Massachusetts Governor Deval Patrick, Attorney General Martha Coakley, and the Massachusetts Democratic Party.

References

External links 
 
 

Living people
Boston University alumni
American real estate businesspeople
Peabody Award winners
American film producers
American company founders
Year of birth missing (living people)